A senate is a deliberative assembly, often the upper house or chamber of a bicameral legislature.

Senate or the Senate may also refer to:
 Any one of the national senates in the world, including
 The Brazilian Senate
 The United States Senate
 An academic senate, faculty senate or senate of a university
 The Roman Senate
 Supreme Court of Latvia
 The fictional Galactic Senate from the Star Wars franchise, the governing body of the Galactic Republic
 Princess Senate Seeiso, the eldest child of King Letsie III of Lesotho
 The Senate (band), a white soul cover band active in Europe in the mid-late 1960s

See also 
 Senator (disambiguation)
 Senat (disambiguation)
 Senet (disambiguation)